Abdullah Sarkar was a Socialist Party of Bangladesh politician and the former Member of Parliament of Comilla-25.

Career
Sarkar was elected to parliament from Comilla-25 as an Independent candidate in 1973. He is a politician of Bangladesher Samajtantrik Dal. He died on 5 February 2013.

References

Awami League politicians
1942 births
2013 deaths
1st Jatiya Sangsad members